Denkyirahene is the title given to the King of the Denkyira people of the Central Region of Ghana. They are part of the Akan ethnic group. The Denkyirahene's official palace is the Amponsem Fie in Dunkwa-on-Offin. He comes from the Agona Clan.

Ghanaian royalty